The Minister of Economic Affairs and Infrastructure of Estonia is a minister at the Ministry of Economic Affairs and Communications in the Estonian Government.

List of Ministers

See also
Ministry of Economic Affairs and Communications

References

External links
Ministry of Economic Affairs and Communications

Economic Affairs and Infrastructure